Boal can refer to:

Boal, Spanish municipality in Asturias
Boal (surname)
Bual, grape/wine
Another name for the Spanish wine grape Doña Blanca
Augusto Boal, Brazilian theater director
Peter Boal, Pacific Northwest Ballet balletmaster and former New York City Ballet principal
Boal (fish), Asian freshwater fish
San Boal, Spanish name for Saint Baudilus
Boal (parish)